Radville station is a former railway station in Radville, Saskatchewan. It was built by the Canadian Northern Railway as part of the Brandon to Lethbridge line. The two-story, wood-frame railway station is at a major division point on the railway line and is the only remaining 2nd-Class CNR railway station building still standing in the province. The building was designed by architect Ralph Benjamin Pratt.  As a major division point from 1911 until the 1950s the site also housed a railway roundhouse. The building was designated a Municipal Heritage Property in 1984. The building is now used as a museum.

References 

Canadian National Railway stations in Saskatchewan
Canadian Northern Railway stations in Saskatchewan
Railway stations in Canada opened in 1912
Disused railway stations in Canada
1912 establishments in Saskatchewan